Bruno Fuchs (born 7 April 1959) is a French politician of La République En Marche! (LREM) who has been serving as a member of the French National Assembly since the 2017 elections, representing the department of Haut-Rhin.

Political career
In parliament, Fuchs serves as member of the Committee on Foreign Affairs and the Committee on European Affairs. He is also a member of the French parliamentary friendship groups with Cuba and Turkey.

In addition to his committee assignments, Fuchs has been a member of the French delegation to the Parliamentary Assembly of the Council of Europe since 2017. In this capacity, he serves on the Committee on Equality and Non-Discrimination.

Political positions
In July 2019, Fuchs voted in favour of the French ratification of the European Union’s Comprehensive Economic and Trade Agreement (CETA) with Canada.

See also
 2017 French legislative election

References

1959 births
Living people
Deputies of the 15th National Assembly of the French Fifth Republic
La République En Marche! politicians
People from Colmar
Politicians from Grand Est
French people of German descent
Deputies of the 16th National Assembly of the French Fifth Republic